Patrice Brun may refer to:

 Patrice Brun (archaeologist) (born 1951), French archaeologist
 Patrice Brun (historian) (born 1953), French historian